Hrastovec is a settlement in the Municipality of Zavrč in the Haloze area of eastern Slovenia. It lies in the hills above the right bank of the Drava River.The area traditionally belonged to the Styria region. It is now included in the Drava Statistical Region.

References

External links
Hrastovec on Geopedia

Populated places in the Municipality of Zavrč